Thiamine pyrophosphate (TPP or ThPP), or thiamine diphosphate (ThDP), or cocarboxylase is a thiamine (vitamin B1) derivative which is produced by the enzyme thiamine diphosphokinase. Thiamine pyrophosphate is a cofactor that is present in all living systems, in which it catalyzes several biochemical reactions.

Thiamine pyrophosphate is synthesized in the cytosol and is required in the cytosol for the activity of transketolase and in the mitochondria for the activity of pyruvate-, oxoglutarate- and branched chain keto acid dehydrogenases. To date, the yeast ThPP carrier (Tpc1p) the human Tpc and the Drosophila melanogaster have been identified as being responsible for the mitochondrial transport of ThPP and ThMP. It was first discovered as an essential nutrient (vitamin) in humans through its link with the peripheral nervous system disease beriberi, which results from a deficiency of thiamine in the diet.

TPP works as a coenzyme in many enzymatic reactions, such as:

 Pyruvate dehydrogenase complex
 Pyruvate decarboxylase in ethanol fermentation
 Alpha-ketoglutarate dehydrogenase complex
 Branched-chain amino acid dehydrogenase complex
 2-hydroxyphytanoyl-CoA lyase 
 Transketolase

Chemistry

Chemically, TPP consists of a pyrimidine ring which is connected to a thiazole ring, which is in turn connected to a pyrophosphate (diphosphate) functional group.

The part of TPP molecule that is most commonly involved in reactions is the thiazole ring, which contains nitrogen and sulfur. Thus, the thiazole ring is the "reagent portion" of the molecule. The C2 of this ring is capable of acting as an acid by donating its proton and forming a carbanion. Normally, reactions that form carbanions are highly unfavorable, but the positive charge on the tetravalent nitrogen just adjacent to the carbanion stabilizes the negative charge, making the reaction much more favorable. A compound with positive and negative charges on adjacent atoms is called an ylide, so sometimes the carbanion form of TPP is referred to as the "ylide form".

Reaction mechanisms
In several reactions, including that of pyruvate dehydrogenase, alpha-ketoglutarate dehydrogenase, and transketolase, TPP catalyses the reversible decarboxylation reaction (aka cleavage of a substrate compound at a carbon-carbon bond connecting a carbonyl group to an adjacent reactive group—usually a carboxylic acid or an alcohol). It achieves this in four basic steps:

The carbanion of the TPP ylid nucleophilically attacks the carbonyl group on the substrate.  (This forms a single bond between the TPP and the substrate.)
The target bond on the substrate is broken, and its electrons are pushed towards the TPP.  This creates a double bond between the substrate carbon and the TPP carbon and pushes the electrons in the N-C double bond in TPP entirely onto the nitrogen atom, reducing it from a positive to neutral form.
In what is essentially the reverse of step two, the electrons push back in the opposite direction forming a new bond between the substrate carbon and another atom.  (In the case of the decarboxylases, this creates a new carbon-hydrogen bond.  In the case of transketolase, this attacks a new substrate molecule to form a new carbon-carbon bond.)
In what is essentially the reverse of step one, the TPP-substrate bond is broken, reforming the TPP ylid and the substrate carbonyl.

See also
 TPP riboswitch

References

External links
UIC.edu

Cofactors
Organophosphates
Thiazoles
Pyrimidines
Thiamine
Pyrophosphates